Circus Boy was an American adventure family western that aired in prime time on NBC, and then on ABC, from 1956 to 1957. It was then rerun by NBC on Saturday mornings, from 1958 to 1960.

Summary

Set in the late 1890s, the title of the series refers to a boy named Corky.  After his parents, "The Flying Falcons," were killed in a trapeze accident, young Corky (Micky Dolenz – billed at the time as Mickey Braddock) was adopted by Joey the Clown (Noah Beery, Jr.), and the whole Burke and Walsh Circus family. When school was brought up for Corky, Joey said he was a school teacher for many years before joining the circus and could easily handle his education.

The young boy quickly found a role with the circus as water boy to Bimbo, a baby elephant whom Corky would come to consider his pet. Riding Bimbo's back, Corky dealt with adolescent problems, and helped the show's adults including Joey,  owner/promoter Big Tim Champion (Robert Lowery) and head canvasman Pete (Guinn Williams), keep the circus successful as the traveling show moved from town to town each week.

Outside of an elephant being the animal companion, the series was similar to popular "boy and his dog" shows of the time, such as Lassie/Jeff's Collie, and The Adventures of Rin Tin Tin.

Unusually, the opening credits billed the regular actors by their character names, rather than their own names.

Cast

Series regulars

Recurring roles and notable guest stars

First episode guest stars
The following cast appeared in the debut episode only. Several sources erroneously list these three, as well as Billy Barty from Episodes 1 and 2, as series regulars.

Episodes

Series overview 
<onlyinclude>

Season 1 (1956–57)

Season 2 (1957)

References in The Monkees
Micky Dolenz sings the theme to the series in "The Monkees at the Circus", an episode of The Monkees. When asked by Mike Nesmith "What 'is' that?", Dolenz responds "It's the theme song for an old TV series".
Their song "Porpoise Song" contains references to the series, most notably with the line "riding the back of giraffes for laughs is alright for a while."

References

External links
 
 Circus Boy, season 1, episode 1 YouTube

1956 American television series debuts
1957 American television series endings
1950s Western (genre) television series
Television series set in the 1890s
American adventure television series
American Broadcasting Company original programming
Black-and-white American television shows
English-language television shows
NBC original programming
Television series by Screen Gems
Circus television shows
Television shows adapted into comics
Television series about adoption